Rank comparison chart of Non-commissioned officer and enlisted ranks for navies of Francophone states.

Other ranks

References

Military ranks of Francophone countries
Military comparisons